Henry Clay Whitney (23 February 1831 – 27 February 1905) was a United States lawyer who was a close friend of President Abraham Lincoln, and later a biographer of the president.

Life
Henry Clay Whitney was born on 23 February 1831 in Detroit, Maine, son of Alfred Metcalf Whitney of Chicago. He received a classical education at Augusta College, Kentucky and at Farmer's College, Ohio, and then studied law at the Cincinnati and Chicago law schools.
In 1854 he moved to Urbana, Illinois, where he entered the practice of law. Around the time when he first appeared at the bar, Whitney met Lincoln, whom he found unselfishly helpful. Whitney became one of Lincoln's friends and political allies, helping him on the Illinois circuit. On 5 August 1857 Whitney married Sarah Ann Snyder, then aged 16. They had five children, two boys and three girls, born between 1858 and 1868.

On 6 August 1861, at the start of the American Civil War, Whitney was appointed Assistant U.S. Paymaster, holding this office until 13 March 1865. While in this office, $11 million passed through his hands. After the war, he settled in Kansas, where he practiced the law, engaged in politics and edited a newspaper. Later he returned to Chicago, where he continued to practice the law. Whitney died in 1905.

Works
Whitney published a two-volume biography of Lincoln, Lincoln the citizen and Lincoln the President, which was published in 1892.
He also published an account of his time with Lincoln in Life on the circuit with Lincoln in 1892.
He published a version of "Lincoln's Lost Speech" in McClure's Magazine in 1896. The speech was made at the Illinois State Republican Convention at Bloomington, Illinois on May 29, 1856, and was said to have been Lincoln's finest. Whitney claimed his version was based on notes he had made while the speech was being delivered, but the accuracy has been questioned due to the 40-year delay before publication. Whitney has been described as "an unscrupulous reporter", willing to stretch the facts to make his point. Benjamin Thomas, another biographer of Lincoln, wrote: "Never a man to underestimate his own powers, Whitney was held at a somewhat lower valuation by his colleagues."

Bibliography

References

Further reading

External links
 
Works by Henry Clay Whitney at Project Gutenberg

1831 births
1905 deaths
Illinois lawyers
People from Somerset County, Maine